David McCoy (August 24, 1915 – February 8, 2020) was an American skier and businessman who founded the Mammoth Mountain Ski Area in 1942.

Early life
McCoy was born in El Segundo, California, in August 1915. He spent the first six years of his life there while his dad worked at the oil refineries in the area. He first visited the eastern Sierra Nevada when he was 13, and went on to make his own first pair of skis in a high school shop class. After finishing the eighth grade, he moved to Washington state to live with his grandparents because his parents divorced. There he met some Norwegian ski jumpers who further sparked Dave's interest in skiing. Right after graduating from high school, he moved to the small census-designated place of Independence, California. Two years later, he moved a few miles north to Bishop. In 1936, McCoy took a job as a hydrographer for the Los Angeles Department of Water and Power, which involved skiing up to 50 miles per day. While being a hydrographer, he joined the Eastern Sierra Ski Club.  At age 22, he became the California State Champion in skiing.

In 1938, McCoy got a permit and set up a primitive rope tow on McGee Mountain, near US Highway 395, using parts from a Model "A" Ford truck. He went to a bank, seeking an $85 loan to set up a permanent rope tow. The bank initially turned him down, but the bank's secretary, Roma (his future wife), urged the bank to make the loan. A few years later, McCoy married Roma. By the early 1940s, the climate started to warm up, however, and the snowfall on McGee Mountain was not as heavy as it had once been. It was suddenly not an ideal location for skiing anymore. Remnants of McCoy's original rope-tow can be spotted, and the site is marked with a historical marker sign along the current Highway 395.

Mammoth Mountain
McCoy noticed that the snow was better at Mammoth Mountain, where he set up a rope tow in 1942. The Forest Service decided then to offer, for bid, the right to operate a ski area on Mammoth Mountain. No one bid on this permit, including McCoy, who didn't have any money. In 1953, the Forest Service gave McCoy the permit on the condition that he develop the mountain as a ski resort. A ski lodge followed in 1953, and the Mammoth Mountain Ski Area incorporated in 1955. McCoy struggled to develop Mammoth. The "lodge" was actually only 12' by 24', had a dirt floor with an outside toilet, and served snacks. The McCoy family used it as a home during the early years of Mammoth. 

McCoy went to the bank again for a loan of $135,000 to build a chair lift.  Again, he was turned down. McCoy eventually got a used chairlift. McCoy and a small group of skiers had to work very hard and dig holes, mix concrete, and install the lift on their own by Thanksgiving 1955.  Chair 1 had a wooden ramp, covered with snow, that skiers had to side-step up to reach the chairs.  Sometimes skiers would lose their balance and cause several of the skiers in line below to topple over like dominoes.  The ramp was removed sometime in 1980s and a new high-speed Chair 1 was installed and renamed "Broadway Express."  The original main lodge was expanded and to this day, the upper part of the old exterior rock wall mural, with a white and brown flagstone arrow and skier, can be seen.   By 1973, under McCoy's leadership, the ski area grew to 14 double-chairs, and a second base lodge originally named Warming Hut II was built.  It was renamed Canyon Lodge in the mid-1990s.  The Mid-chalet lodge was also renamed McCoy.  A cafeteria/bar named the Mill Cafe was built by Chair 2 in the early 2000s, and a portable building named Eagle Lodge with clothes, a bar, and snacks on the left side of the mountain was added as well.

McCoy bought a small airline to fly a few skiers from Burbank, California to Mammoth. The growth of the ski area led to growth of the town of Mammoth Lakes, California, which incorporated in 1984.  In the 1990s, Alpha Airlines briefly flew from Los Angeles to the small Mammoth Airport along Highway 395. In the first decade of the 2000s, Horizon Airlines, began to offer seasonal service from Los Angeles, Reno, and the San Francisco Bay Area to Mammoth.

McCoy faced adversity in growing the ski area: drought in 1958–59, the 1973 oil crisis, and only 94" inches of snow during the 1976–1977 season, the worst in Mammoth's history.

Retirement
In 2005, McCoy announced that he was retiring after running the ski area for 68 years. Mammoth Mountain Ski Area was sold to Starwood Capital Group in a deal that valued Mammoth at $365 million, significantly more than the $135,000 he borrowed in 1953 to build the first lift. He  continued to ski until 2008, but stopped due to a knee replacement and his age. McCoy took up photography as well.

As of 2018, Dave and Roma McCoy had 6 children, 17 grandchildren, 28 great-grandchildren, and 1 great-great-grandchild, a total of 52 descendants.

McCoy turned 100 on August 24, 2015 and “died peacefully in his sleep” on February 8, 2020, at his home in the eastern Sierra Nevada community of Bishop, California at the age of 104.

In popular culture

He was portrayed by Dabney Coleman in the 1975 film The Other Side of the Mountain.

References

1915 births
2020 deaths
American centenarians
American male alpine skiers
American sports businesspeople
Businesspeople from California
Men centenarians
People from El Segundo, California
People from Inyo County, California
People from Mammoth Lakes, California
Sierra Nevada (United States)